Marmaton Township is one of twelve townships in Allen County, Kansas, United States. As of the 2010 census, its population was 877. The majority of inhabitants are farmers.

Geography
According to the USGS, it contains one cemetery, Moran.

The stream of Sweet Branch runs through this township.

References
 USGS Geographic Names Information System (GNIS)

External links
 US-Counties.com
 City-Data.com

Townships in Allen County, Kansas
Townships in Kansas